Persée (Perseus) is an opera by the French composer François-André Danican Philidor first performed at the Académie Royale de Musique, Paris (the Paris Opera) on 24 October 1780. It takes the form of a tragédie lyrique in three acts. The text is a reworking, by Jean-François Marmontel, of a libretto by Philippe Quinault, originally set by Jean-Baptiste Lully in 1682. Philidor's version was not a success.

Roles

Notes

Sources
  Félix Clément and Pierre Larousse Dictionnaire des Opéras, p.525.
  Original libretto on Gallica BNF

Operas by François-André Danican Philidor
Tragédies en musique
French-language operas
1780 operas
Operas